Hapithus is a genus of flightless bush crickets in the family Gryllidae. There are more than 200 described species in Hapithus.

The genus Orocharis was recently determined to be a taxonomic synonym of Hapithus, and is now considered a subgenus of the genus Hapithus.

See also
 List of Hapithus species

References

Further reading

 
 

Hapithinae